The 44th British Academy Film Awards, given by the British Academy of Film and Television Arts in 1991, honoured the best films of 1990.

Martin Scorsese's Goodfellas won the awards for Best Film, Director, Adapted Screenplay, Editing and Costume Design. Cinema Paradiso (Nuovo cinema Paradiso), directed by Giuseppe Tornatore, also won five awards, including Best Film not in the English Language, Actor (Philippe Noiret) and Supporting Actor (Salvatore Cascio).

Winners and nominees

Statistics

See also
 63rd Academy Awards
 16th César Awards
 43rd Directors Guild of America Awards
 4th European Film Awards
 48th Golden Globe Awards
 2nd Golden Laurel Awards
 11th Golden Raspberry Awards
 5th Goya Awards
 6th Independent Spirit Awards
 17th Saturn Awards
 43rd Writers Guild of America Awards

Film044
British Academy Film Awards
British Academy Film Awards
March 1991 events in the United Kingdom
1990 awards in the United Kingdom